Shipwrecked In Oslo is the first DVD release by Arcturus. It was released on August 21, 2006 by Season Of Mist. The DVD includes footage of the band's 15 song performance at the Rockefeller Music Hall during the Sonic Solstice Festival in Oslo, on September 24, 2005. Extra material such as a photo slideshow and rehearsal footage is also included.

Track listing
"At Satans Ship (Introduction)"
"Ad Absurdum"
"Nightmare Heaven"
"Shipwrecked Frontier Pioneer"
"Alone"
"Deception Genesis"
"The Chaos Path"
"Tore's Guitar Solo"
"Deamon Painter"
"Nocturnal Vision Revisited"
"Painting My Horror"
"Steinar's Keyboard Solo"
"Hufsa"
"Master Of Disguise"
"Knut's Guitar Solo"
"White Noise Monster"
"Reflections"
"Raudt Og Svart"

 Tracks 5, 7, 11, 14 were originally released on the album La Masquerade Infernale (1997)
 Track 6 was originally released on the album Disguised Masters (1999)
 Tracks 2, 3 were originally released on the album The Sham Mirrors (2002)
 Tracks 4, 9, 10, 13, 16, 17 were originally released on the album Sideshow Symphonies (2005)
 Track 18 was originally released on the album Aspera Hiems Symfonia (1995)

2006 video albums
Arcturus (band) albums
Live video albums
2006 live albums
Season of Mist albums